EY, Ey, or ey may refer to:

Companies
Ernst & Young, a global network of financial services firms currently branded EY
Eagle Air (Tanzania) (IATA code 1999–2002)
Etihad Airways (IATA code since 2003)

People 
Henri Ey, French psychiatrist
Elaine Youngs, American beach volleyball player

Other uses 
Ey, a Spivak pronoun used in place of "he/she"
Ey, exayear, SI unit for  year
ey (digraph), in languages
-ey (disambiguation), an English diminutive suffix
East York, Ontario ("EY" in an old logo)
Executive Yuan, the executive branch of the Republic of China (Taiwan)